State Highway 199 is a northwest-to-southeast state route that runs from U.S. Route 380/State Highway 59 in Jacksboro to Interstate 30/U.S. Route 377 in Fort Worth.

Route description
SH 199 begins at an intersection with U.S. Route 380/State Highway 59 in Jacksboro near the Jack County courthouse, with the road continuing north as U.S. Route 281/State Highway 114. The highway begins with a concurrency with US 281/US 380/SH 114, with US 380/SH 114 leaving just south of the Jacksboro city limits. SH 199 continues its overlap with US 281 until about 7 miles south of Jacksboro, with US 281 traveling south to Mineral Wells. The highway travels southeast to the town of Joplin, where it intersects with Farm to Market Road 1156. In Springtown, SH 199 goes from a two lane undivided highway to a four lane divided highway. Most of the highway from Azle to near Lakeside is a freeway. SH 199 travels through the town of Lake Worth as a divided highway with a wide median until reaching Interstate 820 at a modified cloverleaf interchange. Just inside Interstate 820, SH 199 enters the city limits of Fort Worth and intersects State Highway 183 just northeast of River Oaks. SH 199 crosses over both the West and Clear Forks of the Trinity River and enters Downtown Fort Worth. At 5th Street, the highway turns south before ending at an interchange with Interstate 30/U.S. Route 377.

Names
 In Jacksboro, SH 199 is routed along South Main Street.
 In Azle, the highway has two names: Northwest Parkway northwest of the center of town, and Southeast Parkway to the southeast.
 In Lake Worth, the highway is known as "Lake Worth Boulevard".
 In Fort Worth, SH 199 within the city limits and northwest of downtown, is known as "Jacksboro Highway", as the route's other end is in Jacksboro.
 In Downtown Fort Worth, the highway is known as "Henderson Street."

History
State Highway 199 was designated on September 18, 1933 from Jacksboro to Olney. On September 26, 1939, SH 199 was extended northwest to Seymour, replacing part of SH 24. On October 30, 1939, SH 199 was extended southeast to Fort Worth, replacing SH 319. On November 25, 1975, the section from Jacksboro to Seymour was transferred to SH 114.

Major intersections

References

199
Transportation in Jack County, Texas
Transportation in Wise County, Texas
Transportation in Parker County, Texas
Transportation in Tarrant County, Texas
Transportation in Fort Worth, Texas